The 1983 season was the sixth in the history of Newcastle KB United. It was also the sixth season in the National Soccer League. In addition to the domestic league, they also participated in the NSL Cup. Newcastle KB United finished 5th in their National Soccer League season, and were eliminated in the NSL Cup second round by Sydney Olympic.

Players

Competitions

Overview

National Soccer League

League table

Results by round

Matches

NSL Cup

Statistics

Appearances and goals
Players with no appearances not included in the list.

Clean sheets

References

Newcastle KB United seasons